Jonathan David Artura (born 31 March 1987) is an Argentine former footballer. He played for Lota Schwager.

External links
 
 

1987 births
Living people
Argentine footballers
Argentine expatriate footballers
Talleres de Córdoba footballers
Central Norte players
Racing de Córdoba footballers
Sportivo Desamparados footballers
C.D. Universidad Católica del Ecuador footballers
Lota Schwager footballers
Primera B de Chile players
Expatriate footballers in Chile
Expatriate footballers in Ecuador
Association football midfielders
Footballers from Córdoba, Argentina